Sebastiano Greco (born 11 February 1953) is an Italian volleyball player. He competed in the men's tournament at the 1980 Summer Olympics.

References

1953 births
Living people
Italian men's volleyball players
Olympic volleyball players of Italy
Volleyball players at the 1980 Summer Olympics
Sportspeople from Catania